Vulture Prince is the third album by Pakistani musician Arooj Aftab, released by New Amsterdam Records on April 23, 2021. Thematically, the album discusses stories of people, relationships, and lost moments and is dedicated to the memory of her younger brother, Maher. "Mohabbat" won the Best Global Music Performance at the 64th Annual Grammy Awards.

Critical reception 

Bhanuj Kappal of Pitchfork called the album a "heartbreaking, exquisite document of the journey from grief to acceptance."

Vulture Prince was named the best album of 2021 by Netherlands newspaper de Volkskrant, topping their year-end list. Brenna Ehrlich ranked the album sixth on Rolling Stones "Best Music of 2021" staff list. It was ranked number twenty by The Guardian on their list of the "50 best albums of 2021", and Laura Snapes named Aftab "[t]he year's biggest musical revelation". While Vulture Prince did not rank on the Los Angeles Times top ten "Best Albums of 2021", it was, however, included on their "15 deserving albums" list.

Barack Obama selected the song "Mohabbat" from this album as one of his summer playlist favorites for 2021. "Mohabbat" was called one of the best songs of 2021 by Time and The New York Times. "Mohabbat" won the Best Global Music Performance at the 64th Annual Grammy Awards.

Track listing

Personnel 
 Arooj Aftab – songwriting, vocals, production
 Maeve Gilchrist – harp (1, 3, 5)
 Darian Donovan Thomas – violin (1, 3)
 Petros Klampanis – double bass (1), piano (3), double bass (3)
 Badi Assad - guitar (2)
 Magda Giannikou – arrangement (2)
 Juliette Jones – strings arrangement (2)
 Rootstock Republic – strings (2)
 Juliette Jones – violin (2)
 Lady Jess – violin (2)
 Jarvis Benson – viola (2)
 Malcolm Parson – cello (2)
 Nadje Noordhuis – flugelhorn (3, 5)
 Bhrigu Sahni – guitar (4)
 Mario Carrillio – double bass (4)
 Jörn Bielfeldt – drums (4)
 Jamey Haddad – percussion (5)
 Gyan Riley – guitar (5)
 Shahzad Ismaily – synth (5, 6)
 Kenji Herbert – guitar (6)
 Annie Ali Khan – lyrics (6)
 Joshua Valleau – mixing, engineering
 Damon Whittemore – mastering
 Vishesh Sharma – photography
 Anum Awan – photo editing
 Micah Blacklight – album artwork
 Vandana Jain – art direction, design

Charts

References 

2021 albums